Religion is the third studio album by French pop rock duo Niagara. It was released in 1990 by Polydor Records. The album was certified double gold by the Syndicat National de l'Édition Phonographique (SNEP).

According to Pascale Hamon of Radio France Internationale, on this album the duo sounds "much more muscular" than at the beginning of their career. ("Over the course of their career. their music will evolve (make a transition) from rock to a much more muscular version on their third album Religion.")

Track listing

Charts

Certifications

References

1990 albums
Niagara (band) albums
Polydor Records albums